Katanga! is an album by saxophonist Curtis Amy recorded in early 1963 for the Pacific Jazz label.

Reception

AllMusic reviewer Scott Yanow observed: "Amy had a fine hard bop-oriented style with a soulful sound. […] Obscure but rewarding music that was overshadowed during the era and was previously long out of print."

Track listing
All compositions by Curtis Amy, except as indicated
 "Katanga" (Dupree Bolton) - 3:02
 "Lonely Woman" - 3:47
 "Native Land" - 10:18
 "Amyable" (Jack Wilson) - 6:11
 "You Don't Know What Love Is" (Don Raye, Gene de Paul) - 5:57
 "A Shade of Brown" (Clifford Solomon) - 5:57

Personnel 
Curtis Amy - tenor saxophone, soprano saxophone
Dupree Bolton - trumpet
Jack Wilson - piano
Ray Crawford - guitar
Victor Gaskin - bass 
Doug Sides - drums

References 

1963 albums
Pacific Jazz Records albums
Curtis Amy albums